The Government of the Republic of Belarus, which consists of the Council of Ministers of the Republic of Belarus, is the executive branch of state power in Belarus, and is appointed by the President of Belarus. The head of the Government is the President of Belarus, who manages the main agenda of the government and direct the ministers. The National Assembly of Belarus is the continuation of the Supreme Soviet of the BSSR and acts as the functioning parliament for Belarus.

Council of Ministers
Below are the 30 members of the Council of Ministers as of 19 August 2020, as well as the head of the presidential administration and the chairmen of the State Committees, who are not technically ministers but are included in the Council of Ministers. Offices which are not technically counted as ministerial posts are italicized. The prime minister, the first deputy prime minister(s), the deputy prime minister(s), the ministers of economy, finance, and foreign affairs, the head of the presidential administration, and the chairman of the State Control Committee  together form the Presidium of the Council of Ministers. These officials are highlighted in yellow. The incumbent government resigned en masse on 17 August 2020. A new government was formed on 19 August 2020, consisting of mostly the same people.

Composition
As of 18 October 2021:

See also
Supreme Soviet of Belarus, the preceding supreme state power in Belarus
National Assembly of Belarus, the current supreme state power in Belarus

References

 
Belarus
Belarus